Linda javanica is a species of beetle in the family Cerambycidae. It was described by Vuillet in 1912. It is known from Sumatra and Java.

Varietas
 Linda javanica var. apicaloides Breuning, 1954
 Linda javanica var. basalis (Aurivillius, 1924)

References

javanica
Beetles described in 1912